Nala Sinephro is a Caribbean-Belgian experimental jazz musician, currently based in London. She is best known for her ambient jazz compositions, where she predominantly plays the pedal harp, modular synthesiser, keyboards and piano.

In 2021, she released her debut studio album, Space 1.8, on Warp Records to widespread critical acclaim. The album placed highly on several music publications' end-of-year lists.

Early life
Nala Sinephro spent her childhood in Belgium, growing up on the outskirts of Brussels, near a forest. Her mother was a classical piano teacher and her father was a jazz saxophonist.

During her teenage years, Sinephro developed a tumor in her jaw. The tumor's successful removal influenced a period of hedonistic living, with Sinephro frequenting Brussels-based clubs to seek out hardcore dance music.

Initially interested in becoming a biochemist, Sinephro eventually transferred to an arts-based high school which featured a jazz department. There, she discovered the harp, which she quickly connected with. Sinephro attended Berklee College of Music in Boston for one year, dropping out after finding her job as a sound engineer provided a more practical education. She moved to London and enrolled in a second jazz college, though she quickly dropped out as a result of the racial disparity there.

Career

Early career
In London, Sinephro became a contemporary of saxophonists Shabaka Hutchings and Nubya Garcia, and the jazz improvisation collective Steam Down, where she developed a sense of individuality in her style. Sinephro began performing with Steam Down regularly, working alongside the London Contemporary Orchestra's artistic director Robert Ames.

Beginning in June 2020, Sinephro hosted her own NTS Radio show.

2018–present: Space 1.8
Sinephro began writing the songs that would appear on Space 1.8 in 2018 and 2019. Writing on piano, she would record her pedal harp and modular synthesiser parts at her home before entering Pink Bird recording studio to record with the album's collaborators, with included saxophonists Nubya Garcia and James Mollison, drummer Jake Long, and bassists Twm Dylan and Wonky logic. Sinephro emphasized minimalism and intentionality when composing the album.

Personal life
Sinephro currently lives in Tottenham, North London. She has family based in the Caribbean island Martinique. During the COVID-19 pandemic, Sinephro spent several months living on Martinique, where she developed an interest in field recordings.

Discography
Studio albums
Space 1.8 (2021)

Guest appearances
"Tympanum" (2021) – Robert Ames
"Together is a Beautiful Place to Be (Nala Sinephro Remix)" (2021) – Nubya Garcia

References

Living people
Jazz bandleaders
Jazz keyboardists
1996 births